Love God is the debut studio album by the electronic band Milk Cult, released in 1992 by Boner Records.

Track listing

Accolades

Personnel
Adapted from the Love God liner notes.

Milk Cult
 Dale Flattum (as C.C. Nova) – bass guitar, loops
 Eric Holland (as Conko) – electronics
 Mike Morasky (as The Bumblebee) – sampler, electronics

Additional musicians
 Mark Brooks (as D.J. 3KSK) – turntables
 Darren Morey (as D.K. Mor-X) – percussion
Production and additional personnel
 Frank Grow – cover art

Release history

References

External links 
 

1992 debut albums
Milk Cult albums
Boner Records albums